Beattie is an unincorporated community located in Comanche County, in the U.S. state of Texas. According to the Handbook of Texas, the community had a population of 50 in 2000.

History
The community was named for local settler Charles F. Beatty, who moved to the community in 1892. There was a grocery store, a cotton gin, a drugstore, a barbershop, and telephone service in the community in the early 1900s. A post office was established at Beattie in 1902 and remained in operation until 1908. The community had a population of 115 in 1930 and had four businesses. Both went down to 50 residents and only two businesses by 1945. There were no more businesses left in the community by the late 1980s and kept its population at 50 in 2000.

Geography

Education
Public education in the community of Beattie is provided by the Comanche Independent School District.

References

Unincorporated communities in Comanche County, Texas
Unincorporated communities in Texas